DAZ interacting zinc finger protein 3 is a protein that in humans is encoded by the DZIP3 gene.

References

Further reading